Juan Jorge Argote (06 January 1907 - 13 September 1990)  was a Bolivian footballer who played as a midfielder for Club Racin Oruro and Club Bolívar.

Career 

During his career who made one appearances for the Bolivia national team at the 1930 FIFA World Cup. 
His career in club football was spent in Club Bolivar between 1929 and 1931

References

External links

1907 births
Year of death missing
Footballers from La Paz
Association football midfielders
Bolivian footballers
Bolivia international footballers
Club Bolívar players
1930 FIFA World Cup players